Roberto Antonelli (born 29 May 1953) is a former Italian football manager and player who played as a striker or as an attacking midfielder.

Club career 
A highly talented yet humble player, throughout his career, Antonelli played for Italian clubs Monza, Vicenza, A.C. Milan, Genoa, and Roma. He contributed to Milan's tenth league title victory during the 1978–79 Serie A season with 21 appearances and 5 goals; following Milan's relegation after their involvement in the Totonero 1980 match-fixing scandal, he remained with the club and played a decisive role in helping the team win the Serie B title in 1981 and earn promotion to Serie A, scoring 15 goals, and finishing the season as the top scorer in Serie B.

Personal life 
His son Luca Antonelli is a professional footballer, currently playing for Empoli as a left back. Throughout his career, Roberto earned the nickname Dustin, due to his resemblance to the actor Dustin Hoffman.

Honours

Club 
A.C. Milan
Serie A: 1978–79
Serie B: 1980–81
Mitropa Cup: 1981–82

Individual 
Serie B Top-scorer: 1980–81 (15 goals)
A.C. Milan Hall of Fame

References

External links 
Profile at MagliaRossonera.it 
Profile at EmozioneCalcio.it 

1953 births
Living people
Italian footballers
Association football forwards
Serie A players
Serie B players
A.C. Monza players
L.R. Vicenza players
A.C. Milan players
Genoa C.F.C. players
A.S. Roma players
U.S.D. 1913 Seregno Calcio managers
Italian football managers
A.C. Monza managers